The SpecOps is a Pump action shotgun manufacture of Argentina, by Rexio.

Development 
It was created taking into account the needs of law enforcement and military Tactical Teams, who know the actions of terrorist groups and criminal. This model is designed entirely in steel, but with the distinction of being much lighter than previous models Rexio

Description 
It has a 3-position retractable stock. Picatinny rail mounted laser sights. Ring type Ghost rise and script. It also has a cannon heatsink covers.

References

Firearms of Argentina
Pump-action shotguns